The Aviation Centre of Excellence(ACE), is the aviation department facility for Confederation College The building consists of two hangars, classrooms, shops, labs, and offices for the three aviation programs available at the School of Aviation.

Origin 
In the late 1990s, Confederation College relocated its programs for Flight Management, Aircraft Maintenance, and Aerospace Manufacturing in one larger facility where students would have new equipment and facilities.

Derek Burney, was the CEO and President of CAE.

Air Canada donated one of its retired Douglas DC-9-32 aircraft (C-FTLT) which arrived for the grand opening celebrations. The aircraft landed with Confederation College emblems in addition to the Air Canada tail paint. The aircraft would later be painted in classic Air Canada colours for a movie shoot. The aircraft eventually fell into disrepair and neglect, and would be scrapped in 2022. During the scrapping process, part of the aircraft caught fire, necessitating the response of airport fire trucks. One engine went to the school’s maintenance program, while various signage, instruments, and small pieces of the fuselage were claimed by staff and students.

Construction of ACE began in 2002, and the building was completed in time for 2003 classes.

Confederation College  Aviation Centre of Excellence has been voted as the "Best Aviation College" in a poll by Aviation Canada.

Location 
The Aviation Centre of Excellence is located at Thunder Bay International Airport, the third-busiest airport in the province of Ontario. The structure is located on the north side of runway 25 and adjacent to the Ornge Hangar. The centre has an apron and taxiway to the runway.

Programs 
There are three full-time post-secondary programs offered at ACE. 
 Aerospace Manufacturing Engineering Technician / Technologist
 Aviation Technician-Aircraft Maintenance
 Aviation Flight Management
The unofficial slogan of the Aviation Centre is "Build it, Fly it, Maintain it", relating to the three respective programs. 
ACE is heavily supported by companies such as Bombardier, Levaero, Jazz, Bearskin Airlines and Wasaya Airways. ACE has hosted the world-renowned Canadian Forces Snowbirds several times and various pilots and mechanics on the team were alumni.

Fleet 
ACE has a fleet of sixteen aircraft used for flight training; consisting of four types of Cessna aircraft. In addition, the school has two advanced flight training devices (or non-motion simulators). One is a level 6 Frasca Beech Baron trainer, and the other is a level 2 generic trainer.

In addition, there is a sizable fleet of non-flying aircraft at ACE that is used by the Aircraft Maintenance program. This includes:
 1 McDonnell Douglas DC-9 engine
 1 Bell 206 Helicopter
 1 OH-58 Kiowa
 1 Bell 47 Helicopter
 4 Cessna 180
 1 Piper Apache
 1 Cessna 172

References

Colleges in Ontario
Education in Thunder Bay
Buildings and structures in Thunder Bay